Franz Koch may refer to:

*Franz Koch (musician) (1761—1831), German Jew's harp performer
Franz Koch (cinematographer) (1898–1959), German cameraman
Franz Koch (writer) (1888–1969), German-Austrian literature historian
Franz Koch (businessman) (born 1979), German businessman, former CEO of Puma SE
Franz Koch, Austrian banker and record producer, founder of Koch International